Bánfalva may refer to:
Gádoros, known as Bánfalva until 1901, a village in Békés County, Hungary
Sopronbánfalva or Bánfalva, a part of Sopron, a city in Hungary
Bánfalva (village), a former village now part of Bánhorváti, a village in Borsod-Abaúj-Zemplén county, Hungary
Bancu, formerly named  (and now ) in Hungarian, a village in Romania

See also
Apetlon, Austria,  in Hungarian